William Nicholas Cayzer, Baron Cayzer (21 January 1910 – 16 April 1999), known as Sir Nicholas Cayzer, 2nd Baronet, from 1943 to 1982, was a British ship-owner responsible for amalgamating the Clan Line, Union-Castle Line, King Line and Bullard King & Company to form the British & Commonwealth Shipping Co. Ltd.

He was the elder son of Sir August Cayzer, 1st Baronet, whom he followed into the shipping business and succeeded to the baronetcy.

In 1944 he became chairman of the Liverpool Steamship Owners Association.

In the 1982 New Year Honours list he was given a life peerage in recognition of his contribution to shipping and politics, and was created Baron Cayzer, of St Mary Axe in the City of London on 8 February.

He had two daughters.

Coat of arms

References

1910 births
1999 deaths
Life peers
English businesspeople in shipping
Nicholas
Baronets in the Baronetage of the United Kingdom
20th-century English businesspeople
Life peers created by Elizabeth II